Walton Hall is a 16th-century country mansion at Walton, near Wellesbourne, Warwickshire, once owned by Lord Field and the entertainer Danny La Rue, now in use as a hotel which is now part of Accor Hotels. It is a Grade II* listed building.

The Manor of Walton was owned by the Lestrange family from the 15th century. In 1541 Barbara Lestrange, heiress of Walton married Robert Mordaunt. Their son Lestrange Mordaunt was created 1st Baronet Mordaunt in 1611.

In 1858 Sir Charles Mordaunt, 10th Baronet retained architect Sir George Gilbert Scott to design a new mansion house in the Gothic Revival style. The current Walton Hall has existed since the mid-19th century, but it sits on the site of several older manor houses and its cellars date back to Elizabeth I's time. It was Sir Charles Mordaunt who built the Victorian Manor house that guests stay in today, and the matching chapel where wedding blessings take place. The house was completed in 1862 and became infamous through a divorce scandal involving Sir Charles and his wife Harriet several years later.

In the mid-20th century, the main property was owned by the Ministry of Defence and used as a training camp for Army cadets and the rest of the estate was used as a girls' boarding school between 1963 and 1969.

By 1969 the estate had deteriorated and was eventually sold to Lord Leslie Charles Field in 1970.
During the early 1970s the entire estate was restored to its former glory with the main hall receiving extensive renovations between 1970 and 1972. Walton Hall was the preferred residence over Pitfour Castle (also owned by Lord Field) and as such it was used as the main family home by throughout the 1970s. When Lord Field retired to his home on the Isle of Man at the end of the decade, the entire estate was sold to the performer Danny La Rue who converted the main house to be used as a hotel. In the 1970s, La Rue spent more than £1 million on the purchase and restoration of Walton Hall and signed it over in 1983, as he could not manage it and his career, to a pair of Canadian con men. La Rue had given control of the hotel to the two Canadians with a promise of further investment with the retention of La Rue's name on the hotel itself. This eventually led to a police investigation where La Rue was cleared of any suspicion but discovered he had lost more than £1 million. The con men had deeply bankrupted La Rue but he insisted in continuing to work to pay off the debts incurred rather than retire.

In the 1980s, Walton Hall was the focus of a timeshare venture which collapsed with debts of £5m; owner Graham Maynard was sentenced to 15 months in jail for fraud, but walked free having spent  months in a Spanish jail.

Today, the adjacent 1860s stable block (Grade II listed) is a time-share accommodation, which is not linked to the 1980s incident.

Walton Hall was featured in Series 5 of the BBC comedy Keeping Up Appearances. In the episode, titled "The Rolls-Royce", Hyacinth and Richard drive a showroom car to Walton Hall.

References

External links
The Walton Hall in Nr. Stratford-upon-Avon
 Photograph and detailed architectural description
Lord Leslie Charles Field

Grade II* listed buildings in Warwickshire
George Gilbert Scott buildings
Hotels in Warwickshire
Country houses in Warwickshire
Grade II* listed houses
1862 establishments in England
Country house hotels